Nanalan' is a Canadian children's television series created by Jamie Shannon and Jason Hopley. It began in 1999 as a series of three-minute shorts and later ran for a season of full-length episodes spanning 21 minutes each. It chronicles the small-scale adventures and discoveries of a three-year-old puppet girl named Mona in her grandmother Nana Bea's backyard. The title is a contraction of the phrase "Nana Land," referring to the setting.

Hopley and Shannon, who continued to work with Nickelodeon afterwards on their creation Mr. Meaty, produced the series through their puppetry troupe The Grogs in association with Lenz Entertainment. The show uses a blend of hand puppetry and the manipulation of cardboard cutouts, particularly in the opening theme. While the shorts do not follow a structure, the half-hour episodes follow a loose format that includes at least one song and reading an original story to the viewers.

The show received three nominations at the 2004 Gemini Awards and was fairly well received by Canadian and US press, with some critics calling attention to the show's surreal presentation and genuine approach to its concept. It was short-lived, as Nickelodeon did not pick up a second season. In 2004, select episodes were released across several DVDs and VHSes in the U.S. In the 2010s, the series went viral with a resurgence in popularity on websites such as Tumblr and YouTube for its bizarre nature.

Plot
The show focuses on Mona, a three-year-old girl with a big imagination and a tendency to repeat short words or phrases while also pronouncing them incorrectly. Each episode begins with Mona's mother dropping her daughter off at Nana's house and ends with her picking Mona up. Mona, Nana, and Nana's pet dog Russell spend the day exploring, learning, and visiting Nana's next-door neighbour Mr. Wooka.

Characters
Mona (Jamie Shannon) is the main character of the series. She is a humanoid two-year-old with green skin, a spherical head, wide bean-shaped eyes, and lime green hair done in pigtails. In the original shorts, she cannot speak in full sentences and can only say a few words. She tends to mispronounce everything she says; for example, she says pea pod as "peepo" and mushroom as "shoosh."
Nana (Jason Hopley) is Mona's grandmother, whom she stays with every weekday while her mother goes to work. She resembles a carrot (a vegetable), with bright orange skin and a very tall forehead. She wears a gaudy multicoloured dress, big circular glasses, and a white wig. In the original shorts, her hair was auburn.
Russell (Ali Eisner) is Nana's pet Jack Russell Terrier dog who accompanies Mona when she visits. He does not talk but can be seen barking or sniffing for communication. Mona pronounces his name incorrectly and often calls him "Russer."
Mr. Wooka (Todd Doldersum) is Nana's next-door neighbour who is a main character in the full-length episodes. He is an elderly man with yellow skin and a white mustache who wears blue overalls. Whenever Mona visits his yard, he puts on his own puppet shows to entertain her.
Mrs. Bea (Marty Stelnick) is Mona's mother and Nana's daughter. She has a similar appearance to Mona but is taller and has brown hair in a bowl cut. She is a parent who works during the day and leaves Mona in Nana's care most of the time.

Production
The show was filmed in a building "reputed to be an old munitions factory" in the television production district of Liberty Village in Toronto, Ontario. The shorts were produced in 1999.

Jason Hopley and Jamie Shannon continued to build a relationship with Nickelodeon during and after Nanalan''', appearing on the fellow Nick Jr. series Whoopi's Littleburg (with Goldberg) in 2004 and creating a teen-oriented sitcom for the network titled Mr. Meaty in 2005.

Telecast and media releasesNanalan' was first aired on Nickelodeon's sister channel Noggin. They later appeared on Nickelodeon as part of the Nick Jr. block and on the Canadian CBC Television, which eventually became a broadcaster of the full-length episodes. Repeats of the shorts continued to air until late 2003, when the first full-length season was produced. CBC premiered the full-length episodes in January 2004, followed by their U.S. debut on Nickelodeon in summer of the same year.

The show also aired on PBS Kids.

In 2004, Nickelodeon released a set of six DVDs and VHSes including selections of the three-minute shorts. The discs and were mainly sold in the U.S. Rather than simply Nanalan, the home media billed the show as Welcome to Nanalan: As Seen on Nickelodeon. The full-length seasons were neither released to DVD nor VHS.

The episodes were uploaded to YouTube in 2007 and are still available.

Reception
During its short run, the series received mostly positive attention from media critics, some of which felt that the show's bizarre and unconventional nature made it more appealing and watchable by viewers of all ages. Toronto Star said that "the series' surprising sweetness, simplicity and humour strike a universal chord with both adults and kids." Writers for the Windsor Star enjoyed its surreal approach to depicting early childhood, saying that "the creators have captured the essence of what it is to be three." A review from the Canadian newspaper Broadcast Week said that "it made me laugh out loud, even though I'm out of the target audience by more than a couple of decades."

Awards and nominations
In 2004, the series was nominated for the following three Gemini Awards: Best Performance in a Pre-School Program or Series; Best Writing in a Children's or Youth Program or Series; and Best Pre-School Program or Series. Nanalan won Best Writing and Best Performance, and the award was shared by all of the puppeteers.

See also
 Mr. Meaty'', Hopley and Shannon's second television series

References

External links

 Nanalan': Episode Guide
 Nanalan': Episode Guide

1999 Canadian television series debuts
2004 Canadian television series endings
1990s Canadian children's television series
2000s Canadian children's television series
1990s preschool education television series
2000s preschool education television series
Canadian preschool education television series
CBC Kids original programming
PBS Kids shows
YTV (Canadian TV channel) original programming
Canadian television shows featuring puppetry
Interstitial television shows
Television series about children